The Perch River is a  tributary of the Sturgeon River in Iron County and Baraga County on the Upper Peninsula of Michigan in the United States. The Perch River begins at the outlet of Perch Lake in Bates Township and flows north through Ottawa National Forest to the Sturgeon River.

See also
List of rivers of Michigan

References

Michigan  Streamflow Data from the USGS

Rivers of Michigan
Rivers of Iron County, Michigan
Rivers of Baraga County, Michigan
Tributaries of Lake Superior